This is a list of the best-selling singles and best-selling albums in Ireland in 2003.

Top selling singles 

 "We've Got the World" - Mickey Joe Harte
 "Where Is the Love?" - The Black Eyed Peas
 "In da Club" - 50 Cent
 "Ignition (Remix)" - R. Kelly
 "Mandy" - Westlife
 "Lose Yourself" - Eminem
 "A Better Plan" - Simon Casey
 "White Flag" - Dido
 "All the Things She Said" - t.A.T.u.
 "Sound of the Underground" - Girls Aloud

Top selling albums 

 In The Zone - Britney Spears
 Life for Rent - Dido
 Justified - Justin Timberlake
 In Time: The Best of R.E.M. 1988–2003 - R.E.M.
 Stripped - Christina Aguilera
 A Rush of Blood to the Head - Coldplay
 So Much for the City - The Thrills
 Number Ones - Michael Jackson
 Dangerously in Love - Beyoncé
 Get Rich or Die Tryin' - 50 Cent

Notes:
 *Compilation albums are not included.

See also 
List of songs that reached number one on the Irish Singles Chart
List of artists who reached number one in Ireland

References

External links 
IRMA Official Site
Top40-Charts - Ireland Top 20

2003 in Irish music
2003